Bjarne Klavestad (21 September 1905 – 10 May 1930) was a Norwegian footballer. He played in two matches for the Norway national football team in 1926.

References

External links
 

1905 births
1930 deaths
Norwegian footballers
Norway international footballers
Place of birth missing
Association footballers not categorized by position